FZH may refer to:
 Faizabad, in India
 Frankfurt Zeilsheim station, in Germany
 Frizinghall railway station, in England